Southbury is a London Overground station on the Southbury Loop section of the Lea Valley lines, located on the easterly side of Enfield in north London.

The station is in Travelcard Zone 5.

History
The line was known as the Churchbury Loop.

The district was still predominantly rural, and the coming of the tram to Waltham Cross in 1904 saw the railway unable to compete. Passenger services ceased on 1 October 1909, but were reinstated for munitions workers between 1 March 1915 and 1 July 1919.

After that the line was used only by goods trains until it was electrified as part of a wider scheme, and the station reopened as Southbury on 21 November 1960. The line is now known as the Southbury Loop. The goods yard closed in 1970.

On 31 May 2015, the station and all services that call transferred from Abellio Greater Anglia to London Overground Rail Operations.

Services
The typical off-peak service of trains per hour (tph) is as follows:

Connections
London Buses routes 121, 191, 307 and 313 serve the station.

References

External links

Railway stations in the London Borough of Enfield
Enfield, London
Former Great Eastern Railway stations
Railway stations in Great Britain opened in 1891
Railway stations in Great Britain closed in 1909
Railway stations in Great Britain opened in 1915
Railway stations in Great Britain closed in 1919
Railway stations in Great Britain opened in 1960
Reopened railway stations in Great Britain
1891 establishments in England
Railway stations served by London Overground